Beaverville is an unincorporated community located within Southampton Township in Burlington County, New Jersey, United States. The area is composed of single-family homes, small businesses and warehouses, forest, and farmland. Originally, the settlement was the site of a one-room schoolhouse.

References

Southampton Township, New Jersey
Unincorporated communities in Burlington County, New Jersey
Unincorporated communities in New Jersey